The Canadian Parliamentary Review is a quarterly publication of the Canadian Region of the Commonwealth Parliamentary Association. The publication began as a newsletter known as the Canadian Regional Review in 1978 with a provisional six-member editorial board. Renamed in 1980, it adopted a format change under its first editor, Gary Levy. The current editor is Will Stos.

The stated objective of the journal is "to inform Canadian legislators about activities of the federal, provincial and territorial branches of the Canadian Region of the Commonwealth Parliamentary Association and to promote the study of and interest in Canadian parliamentary institutions." It publishes articles by and about present and former legislators as well as legislative staff, professors, journalists and others interested in legislative institutions. The Canadian Parliamentary Review is distributed to all federal, provincial and territorial legislators in Canada and by subscription to interested individuals and institutions in Canada, the United States and throughout the Commonwealth. The Review is also published in a separate French language edition known as La Revue parlementaire canadienne. All back issues are available on the web.

References

External links
 The Canadian Parliamentary Review website containing current and back issues in English and French.
 The former Canadian Parliamentary Review website in English and French. Now serves as archives.

Political magazines published in Canada
Quarterly magazines published in Canada
Legal magazines
Magazines established in 1978
French-language magazines published in Canada
Magazines published in Toronto
1978 establishments in Ontario